Madhav Vaze (born 21 October 1939) is a theater artist, director and film actor. He has acted and directed mainly in theater and has had a few stints in films.

Early life
He was born on 21 October 1939.

Career
He started out his career as a child artist in the critically acclaimed film Shyamchi Aai.

In 2009, Vaze made a guest appearance in the Bollywood film 3 Idiots. Director Aamir Khan expressed that he would like to work with Vaze in the theater.

In 2013, Vaze directed a production of Hamlet in Marathi, translated by Parshuram Deshpande and featuring Kanak Datye and Neha Mahajan.

He is a former English lecturer at the Nowrosjee Wadia College in Pune.

In March 2015 he appeared in the Vodafone m-Pesa advertisement as Babuji. The advert can be found at https://www.youtube.com/watch?v=ktgDPTlFxsU

Filmography
Shyamchi Aai (1953)
’’Vahininchya Bangadya’’ (1953)
3 Idiots (2009)
Dear Zindagi (2016)
Chappad Phaad Ke (2019) as Atmaram Gupchup

Awards
His debut film Shyamchi Aai won the President's award and was one of the first films ever in India.

References

External links
 

1939 births
Living people
20th-century Indian male actors
Indian theatre directors
21st-century Indian male actors
Indian male film actors
Male actors in Hindi cinema
Indian male child actors
Place of birth missing (living people)